Mount Cliche is a mountain in Le Granit Regional County Municipality, in administrative region of Estrie, Quebec, in Canada.

Geography 
The mountain is located in range 4 which leads to lac aux Araignées in the municipality of Frontenac.

Toponymy
The toponym "Mont Cliche" was formalized on December 5, 1968 by the Commission de toponymie du Québec.

Notes and references 

Appalachian summits
Summits of Estrie
Le Granit Regional County Municipality
Mountains of Quebec under 1000 metres